Slag is a by-product of smelting (pyrometallurgical) ores and used metals. Broadly, it can be classified as ferrous (by-products of processing iron and steel), ferroalloy (by-product of ferroalloy production) or non-ferrous/base metals (by-products of recovering non-ferrous materials like copper, nickel, zinc and phosphorus). Within these general categories, slags can be further categorized by their precursor and processing conditions (e.g., blast furnace (BF) slags, air-cooled blast furnace (ACBF) slag, basic oxygen furnace (BOF) slag, and electric arc furnace (EAF) slag).

Due to the large demand for these materials, slag production has also significantly increased throughout the years despite recycling (most notably in the iron and steelmaking industries) and upcycling efforts. The World Steel Association (WSA) estimates that 600 kg of by-products (about 90 wt% is slags) are generated per tonne of steel produced.

Composition

Slag is usually a mixture of metal oxides and silicon dioxide. However, slags can contain metal sulfides and elemental metals.

The major components of these slags include the oxides of calcium, magnesium, silicon, iron, and aluminium, with lesser amounts of manganese, phosphorus, and others depending on the specifics of the raw materials used. Furthermore, slag can be classified based on the abundance of iron among other major components.

Ore smelting

In nature, iron, copper, lead, nickel, and other metals are found in impure states called ores, often oxidized and mixed in with silicates of other metals. During smelting, when the ore is exposed to high temperatures, these impurities are separated from the molten metal and can be removed. Slag is the collection of compounds that are removed. In many smelting processes, oxides are introduced to control the slag chemistry, assisting in the removal of impurities and protecting the furnace refractory lining from excessive wear. In this case, the slag is termed synthetic. A good example is steelmaking slag: quicklime (CaO) and magnesite (MgCO3) are introduced for refractory protection, neutralizing the alumina and silica separated from the metal, and assisting in the removal of sulfur and phosphorus from the steel.

As a co-product of steelmaking, slag is typically produced either through the blast furnace - oxygen converter route or the electric arc furnace - ladle furnace route. To flux the silica produced during steelmaking, limestone and/or dolomite are added, as well as other types of slag conditioners such as calcium aluminate or fluorspar.

Classifications 

There are three types of slag: ferrous, ferroalloy, non-ferrous slags, which are produced through different smelting processes.

Ferrous slag 
Ferrous slags are produced in different stages of the iron and steelmaking processes resulting in varying physiochemical properties. Additionally, the rate of cooling of the slag material affects its degree of crystallinity further diversifying its range of properties.  For example, slow cooled BF slags (or air-cooled slags) tend have more crystalline phases than quenched BF slags (ground granulated blast furnace slags) making it denser and better suited as an aggregate. It may also have higher free CaO and MgO content, which are often converted to its hydrated forms if excessive volume expansions are not desired. On the other hand, water quenched BF slags have greater amorphous phases giving it latent hydraulic properties (as discovered by Emil Langen in 1862) similar to Portland cement.

During the process of smelting iron, ferrous slag is created, but dominated by calcium and silicon compositions. Through this process, ferrous slag can be broken down into blast furnace slag (produced from iron oxides of molten iron), then steel slag (forms when steel scrap and molten iron combined). The major phases of ferrous slag contain calcium-rich olivine-group silicates and melilite-group silicates.

Slag from steel mills in ferrous smelting is designed to minimize iron loss, which gives out the significant amount of iron, following by oxides of calcium, silicon, magnesium, and aluminium.

Based on a case study at the Hopewell National Historical Site in Berks and Chester counties, Pennsylvania, USA, ferrous slag usually contains lower concentration of various types of trace elements than non-ferrous slag. However, some of them, such as arsenic (As), iron, and manganese, can accumulate in groundwater and surface water to levels that can exceed environmental guidelines.

Non-ferrous slag 
Non-ferrous slag is produced from non-ferrous metals of natural ores. Non-ferrous slag can be characterized into copper, lead, and zinc slags due to the ores' compositions, and they have more potential to impact the environment negatively than ferrous slag. The smelting of copper, lead and bauxite in non-ferrous smelting, for instance, is designed to remove the iron and silica that often occurs with those ores, and separates them as iron-silicate-based slags. 

Copper slag, the waste product of smelting copper ores, was studied in an abandoned Penn Mine in California, USA. For six to eight months per year, this region is flooded and become a reservoir for drinking water and irrigation. Samples collected from the reservoir showed the higher concentration of cadmium (Cd) and lead (Pb) that exceeded regulatory guidelines.

Applications 
Slags can serve other purposes, such as assisting in the temperature control of the smelting, and minimizing any re-oxidation of the final liquid metal product before the molten metal is removed from the furnace and used to make solid metal. In some smelting processes, such as ilmenite smelting to produce titanium dioxide, the slag can be the valuable product.

Ancient uses
During the Bronze Age of the Mediterranean area there were a vast number of differential metallurgical processes in use. A slag by-product of such workings was a colorful, glassy material found on the surfaces of slag from ancient copper foundries. It was primarily blue or green and was formerly chipped away and melted down to make glassware products and jewelry. It was also ground into powder to add to glazes for use in ceramics. Some of the earliest such uses for the by-products of slag have been found in ancient Egypt.

Historically, the re-smelting of iron ore slag was common practice, as improved smelting techniques permitted greater iron yields—in some cases exceeding that which was originally achieved. During the early 20th century, iron ore slag was also ground to a powder and used to make agate glass, also known as slag glass.

Modern uses

Construction 
Utilization of slags in the construction industry dates back to the 1800s, where BF slags were used to build roads, and railroad ballast. During this time, it was also used as an aggregate and have begun being integrated into the cement industry as a geopolymer. 

Today, ground granulated blast furnace slags (GGBFS) are used in combination with Portland cement (PC) to create "slag cement." GGBFS react with portlandite (Ca(OH)2), which is formed during cement hydration, via the pozzolanic reaction to produce cementitious properties that primarily contribute to the later strength gain of concrete. This leads to concrete with reduced permeability and better durability. Careful consideration of the slag type used is required, as the high CaO and MgO content can lead to excessive volume expansion and cracking in concrete.

These hydraulic properties have also been used for soil stabilization in roads and railroads constructions.

Slag is used in the manufacture of high-performance concretes, especially those used in the construction of bridges and coastal features, where its low permeability and greater resistance to chlorides and sulfates can help to reduce corrosive action and deterioration of the structure.

Slag can also be used to create fibers used as an insulation material called slag wool.

Slag is also used as aggregate in asphalt concrete for paving roads. A 2022 study in Finland found that road surfaces containing ferrochrome slag release a highly abrasive dust that has caused car parts to wear at significantly greater than normal rates.

Wastewater treatment and agriculture 
Dissolution of slags generate alkalinity that can be used to precipitate out metals, sulfates, and excess nutrients (nitrogen and phosphorus) in wastewater treatment. Similarly, ferrous slags have been used as soil conditioners to rebalance soil pH and fertilizers as sources of calcium and magnesium.  

Because of the slowly released phosphate content in phosphorus-containing slag, and because of its liming effect, it is valued as fertilizer in gardens and farms in steel making areas. However, the most important application is construction.

Emerging applications 
Slags have one of the highest carbonation potential among the industrial alkaline waste due their high CaO and MgO content, inspiring further studies to test its feasibility in CO2 capture and storage (CCS) methods (e.g., direct aqueous sequestration, dry gas-solid carbonation among others). Across these CCS methods, slags can be transformed into precipitated calcium carbonates to be used in the plastic, and concrete industries and leached for metals to be used in the electronic industries.

However, high physical and chemical variability across different types of slags results in performance and yield inconsistencies. Moreover, stoichiometric-based calculation of the carbonation potential can lead to overestimation that can further obfuscate the material's true potential. To this end, some have proposed performing a series of experiments testing the reactivity of a specific slag material (i.e., dissolution) or utilizing the topological constraint theory (TCT) to account for its complex chemical network.

Environmental impact

Slags are transported along with slag tailings to "slag dumps," where they are exposed to weathering, with the possibility of leaching of toxic elements and hyperalkaline runoffs into the soil and water, endangering the local ecological communities. Leaching concerns are typically around non-ferrous or base metal slags, which tend to have higher concentrations of toxic elements. However, ferrous and ferroalloy slags may also have them, which raises concerns about highly weathered slag dumps and upcycled materials.

Dissolution of slags can produce highly alkaline groundwater with pH values above 12. The calcium silicates (CaSiO4) in slags react with water to produce calcium hydroxide ions that leads to a higher concentration of hydroxide (OH-) in ground water. This alkalinity promotes the mineralization of dissolved  (from the atmosphere) to produce calcite (CaCO3), which can accumulate to as thick as 20 cm. This can also lead to the dissolution of other metals in slag, such as iron (Fe), manganese (Mn), nickel (Ni), and molybdenum (Mo), which become insoluble in water and mobile as particulate matter. The most effective method to detoxify alkaline ground water discharge is air sparging.

Fine slags and slag dusts generated from milling slags to be recycled into the smelting process or upcycled in a different industry can be carried by the wind, affecting a larger ecosystem. It can be ingested, posing a direct health risk to the communities near the plant, mines, and disposal sites. 

According to the 2019 International Energy Agency (IEA) report, the iron and steel industry directly contributed 2.6 Gt to global CO2 emissions and accounted for 7% of global energy demand. The IEA report and the WSA project a continual increase in demand in the coming years prompting greater efforts to move toward a circular economy.

See also

 Calcium cycle
 Circular economy
 Clinker (waste)
 Dross
 Fly ash
 Ground granulated blast furnace slag
 Mill scale
 Pozzolan
 Slag (welding)
 Spoil tip
 Tailings

References

Further reading

 
 
 

Amorphous solids
Materials with minor glass phase
Steelmaking
Smelting
By-products